This is a list of notable people who have been assassinated in Africa.

Algeria

Angola

Benin

Burkina Faso

Burundi

Cameroon

Central African Republic

Chad

Comoros

Republic of the Congo

Ivory Coast

Democratic Republic of the Congo

Egypt

Equatorial Guinea

Eswatini

Ethiopia

The Gambia

Ghana

Guinea

Guinea-Bissau

Kenya

Liberia

Libya

Madagascar

Malawi

Mauritania

Mauritius

Morocco

Mozambique

Namibia

Niger

Nigeria

Rwanda

Senegal

Somalia

South Africa

Sudan

Tanzania

Togo

Tunisia

Uganda

Western Sahara

Zambia

Zimbabwe

See also
List of people who survived assassination attempts
List of assassinations by car bombing
List of assassins, assassin, terrorist
List of assassinated anticolonialist leaders

References

Africa
Murders in Africa
Assassinations